The 2016–17 Deportivo de La Coruña season was the club's 110th in its history and its 45th in La Liga, the top-tier of Spanish football. In addition to the domestic league, the club also competed in the 2016–17 Copa del Rey.

Squad

Current squad

Out on loan

Transfers

In

Loan in

Out

Loan out

Pre-season and friendlies

Competitions

La Liga

League table

Result round by round

Matches

References

External links
Club's official website

Deportivo de La Coruna
Deportivo de La Coruña seasons